Cinco Villas may refer to:
 Cinco Villas, Navarra a comarca in Navarra
 Cinco Villas, Aragon a comarca in Aragon